Kaicheng (开城) may refer to the following locations in China:

 Kaicheng, Anhui
 Kaicheng, Ningxia, in Yuanzhou District, Guyuan

See also 
 Kaesong, North Hwanghae, North Korea, whose Hanja name, when transliterated into Mandarin, is Kaicheng